A-Men 2 is puzzle-platform game released on 24 June 2015 for Microsoft Windows, and on 5 November 2015 for PlayStation 3 and PlayStation Vita.

Reception 
Review aggregator website, Metacritic, stated that A-Men 2s PlayStation 3 release received "generally unfavorable reviews", and scored 34% whilst the Vita release received "Mixed or average reviews" and scored of 58.

References 

2015 video games
PlayStation 3 games
PlayStation Vita games
Windows games
Indie video games
Puzzle-platform games
Single-player video games
Video games developed in Poland
Bloober Team games